Ski Classics is a series of long-distance cross-country ski races in classic style that has been held since 2011. In season XII, 2021–2022, the circuit included 15 events, in a professional tour for the 35 Pro Teams involved. From 2015 to 2022, the official name of the circuit was Visma Ski Classics, thanks to their main sponsor. The special thing about the Ski Classics concept is that anyone can start the races: professional or amateur, male or female, 25 or 75 years old. Everyone stands together on the same starting line to face the same weather conditions and the same course.

Ski Classics has also, since April 2019, launched the concept of Challengers. This tour has been created to connect and promote long distance skiing events worldwide. By autumn 2021, 39 races were on the Challenger calendar, combining cross-country skiing in winter and roller skiing throughout the year.

History
The cup was first arranged in 2011. The Czech skier Stanislav Řezáč won the men's overall cup, and the Swiss skier Seraina Boner won the ladies' overall cup.

In 2012, the cup consisted of 7 races.  The races were Jizerská padesátka, Marcialonga, König Ludwig Lauf, Tartu Maraton, Vasaloppet, Birkebeinerrennet and the final Norefjellrennet which was cancelled because of lack of snow. The Norwegian cross country skier Anders Aukland won the overall cup. He participated for the Norwegian team Team Xtra Personell. The Swedish skier Jenny Hansson won the ladies' overall cup.

In 2013, the cup consisted of 6 races, Jizerská padesátka, Marcialonga, König Ludwig Lauf, Vasaloppet, Birkebeinerrennet and Årefjällslopet. It is an overall-cup, a sprintpoints-cup, a youth-cup and a team competition. The most profiled teams are Team Xtra Personell, Team United Bakeries, Team Coop, Team Tynell, Team Skinfit Racing Team and Team Skigo.

In 2014, the cup consisted of 6 races, among them La Diagonela, Marcialonga and Vasaloppet. Rickard Tynell won the first race, held in Switzerland due to lack of snow in Czech Republic.

Events Season XII: 2021/2022

Previous winners 
2011
Teams
Team Xtra Personell
Team Exspirit
Team United Bakeries

Champion Men
Stanilslav Rezac
Jerry Ahrlin
Anders Aukland

Champion Women
Seraina Boner
Jenny Hansson
Susanne Nyström

Sprint
Anders Aukland

Youth Men
Anton Sjöholm

Youth Women
Laila Kveli

2012
Teams
Team Xtra Personell
Team Exspirit
Team United Bakeries

Champion Men
Anders Aukland
Stanislav Rezac
Jörgen Brink

Champion Women
Jenny Hansson
Susanne Nyström
Seraina Boner

Sprint
Stanislav Rezac

Youth Men
Morten Eide Pedersen

Youth Women
Laila Kveli

2013
Teams
Team Xtra Personell
Team Coop
Team United Bakeries

Champion Men
Anders Aukland
Jörgen Aukland
Stanlislav Rezac

Champion Women
Seraina Boner
Laila Kveli
Jenny Hansson

Sprint
Simen Östensen

Youth Men
Morten Eide Pedersen

Youth Women
Laila Kveli

2014
Teams
Team United Bakeries
Team Centric
Team Coop-Exspirit

Champion Men
Johan Kjölstad
John Kristian Dahl
Simen Östensen

Champion Women
Seraina Boner
Laila Kveli
Susanne Nyström

Sprint
John Kristian Dahl

Youth Men
Christoffer Callesen

Youth Women
Inger Liv Bjerkreim Nilsen

2014/2015

Teams
Team Santander
Team United Bakeries
Team Coop

Champion Men
Petter Eliassen, Team Leaseplan Go
Anders Aukland, Team Santander
Tord Asle Gjerdalen, Team Santander

Champion Women
Katerina Smutna, Team Silvini Madshus
Seraina Boner, Team Coop-Exspirit
Britta Johansson Norgren, Team SkiProAm

Sprint
Öystein Pettersen, Team United Bakeries

Youth Men
Anders Malmen Höst, Lyn Ski

Youth Women
Tone Sundvor, Team Synnfjell

References

External links
 

Ski marathons
Skiing in Europe
Recurring sporting events established in 2011